Big Cliff is an album by American jazz percussionist Kahil El'Zabar and his Ritual Trio, which also includes saxophonist Ari Brown and bassist Malachi Favors, and the guest appearance of violinist Billy Bang. It was recorded live in 1994 at the Chicago Undergroung Fest and released on Delmark.

Reception

In his review for AllMusic, Alex Henderson states "The musicians' diverse set reflects their interest in both inside and outside playing.. Big Cliff is a CD that El'Zabar and his colleagues can easily be proud of."

The Penguin Guide to Jazz says "Though the music is dedicated to El'Zabar's late father, it is celebratory; scarcely a new take either on what he's done before or on Chicago jazz itself, it's nevertheless a very satisfying record.

Track listing
All compositions by Kahil El'Zabar
 "Another Kind of Groove" – 10:13
 "Big Cliff" – 19:47
 "For the Love of My Father" – 13:06
 "Blue Rwanda" – 21:16

Personnel
Kahil El'Zabar –  African drums, drums, thumb piano
Ari Brown – tenor sax, piano
Malachi Favors – bass
Billy Bang – violin

References

1995 live albums
Kahil El'Zabar live albums
Delmark Records live albums